Elisabeth Bol-Smit (1904-1987) was a Dutch painter.

Biography 
Bol-Smit née Smit was born on 13 February 1904 in Hellevoetsluis. In 1927 she married the art historian Laurens Johannes Bol (1898-1994).
Her work was included in the 1939 exhibition and sale Onze Kunst van Heden (Our Art of Today) at the Rijksmuseum in Amsterdam.

Bol-Smit died on 31 May 1987 in Dordrecht.

External links
images of Bol-Smit's work on MutualArt

References

1904 births
1987 deaths
20th-century Dutch women artists